Juicio Final (2019) (Spanish for "Final  Judgement" 2019) was a professional wrestling supercard produced by Consejo Mundial de Lucha Libre (CMLL), which took take place on May 31, 2019, at Arena México in Mexico City, Mexico. The 2019 Juicio Final event was the fifteenth event promoted under the Juicio Final chronology.

The main event, a Lucha de Apuesta ("Bet match"), saw Último Guerrero defeat Máscara Año 2000, forcing him to have all his hair shaved off as a result of his loss. The seven-match show also featured an additional Lucha de Apuesta where Mexican female wrestler La Amapola defeated Japanese women's wrestling star Kaho Kobayashi. Also on the show, Los Guerreros Laguneros (Euforia and Gran Guerrero) defeated Diamante Azul and Valiente to win the CMLL World Tag Team Championship and Virus defeated Metálico in a Lucha de Apuesta where the loser was forced to retire from wrestling.

Production

Background
For decades Arena México, the main venue of the Mexican professional wrestling promotion Consejo Mundial de Lucha Libre (CMLL), would close down in early December and remain closed into either January or February to allow for renovations as well as letting Circo Atayde occupy the space over the holidays. As a result, CMLL usually held a "end of the year" supercard show on the first or second Friday of December in lieu of their normal Super Viernes show. 1955 was the first year where CMLL used the name "El Juicio Final" ("The Final Judgement") for their year-end supershow. Until 2000 the Jucio Final name was always used for the year end show, but since 2000 has at times been used for shows outside of December. It is not an annually recurring show, but instead held intermittently sometimes several years apart and not always in the same month of the year either. All Juicio Final shows have been held in Arena México in Mexico City, Mexico which is CMLL's main venue, its "home".

Storylines
The Juicio Final event featured seven professional wrestling matches with different wrestlers involved in pre-existing scripted feuds and storylines. Wrestlers portrayed heels (referred to as rudos in Mexican lucha libre, those that portray the "bad guys") or faces (técnicos in Mexican lucha libre, the "good guy" characters) as they participated in a series of tension-building events, which culminated in a wrestling match or series of matches.

Results

References

2019 in Mexican sports
2019 in professional wrestling
CMLL Juicio Final
May 2019 events in Mexico